The B. P. Waggener House is a historic three-story house in Atchison, Kansas. It was built in 1884 for Balie P. Waggener, the general counsel of the Missouri Pacific Railroad. It was sold out of the Waggener family in the 1950s.

The house was designed in the Victorian architectural style. It has been listed on the National Register of Historic Places since May 3, 1974.

References

Houses on the National Register of Historic Places in Kansas
National Register of Historic Places in Atchison County, Kansas
Victorian architecture in Kansas
Houses completed in 1884